Cañada or La Canyada is a Spanish municipality in the comarca of Alt Vinalopó, province of Alicante, Valencian Community.

References

External links
Official website 

This article contains information from the Spanish Wikipedia article Cañada (Alicante), accessed on January 26, 2008.

Municipalities in the Province of Alicante